Boreti (Serbian Cyrillic: Борети) is a coastal village and a popular tourist destination in the municipality of Budva, Montenegro.

Demographics
According to the 2011 census, its population was 212.

173 Montenegrins (51.95%)
96 Serbs (28.83%)
64 Others (19.22%)

References

Populated places in Budva Municipality